Two ships of the Royal Navy have borne the name HMS Moth after the insect, the Moth:

  was a coastal destroyer launched in 1907. She had been renamed TB 12 in 1906. She was sunk by a mine in 1915.
  was an  launched in 1915. She was scuttled in 1941 but was salvaged by the Japanese and recommissioned with the Imperial Japanese Navy as Suma. She was sunk by a mine in 1945.

Royal Navy ship names